Sigrud Kummer is a West German sprint canoeist who competed in the late 1960s. She won a silver medal in the K-4 500 m event at the 1966 ICF Canoe Sprint World Championships in East Berlin.

References

West German female canoeists
Living people
Year of birth missing (living people)
ICF Canoe Sprint World Championships medalists in kayak